James Kirton may refer to:
James Kirton (swimmer), British swimmer
James Kirton (died 1620), MP for Ludgershall and Great Bedwyn
James Kirton (MP for Wells) (died 1611)